The 2018 NCAA Women's Division I Swimming and Diving Championships were contested March 14-17, 2018 at the 37th annual NCAA-sanctioned swim meet to determine the team and individual national champions of Division I women's collegiate swimming and diving in the United States. 

This year's events were hosted by Ohio State University at the McCorkle Aquatic Pavilion in Columbus, Ohio.

Stanford went back-to-back in national titles for the first time since 1996, and their tenth overall title. They finished 220 points ahead of California. The Cardinal scored in every single event except for the 1 meter diving and the platform diving. Stanford also became the third team to sweep all five relays at an NCAA Championship.

Ella Eastin of Stanford was awarded the 2018 CSCAA Swimmer of the Year with her victories in the 200 IM, 400 IM, and 200 butterfly. Her wins in the 200 IM and 400 IM were both American records. She was also a part of two winning relays, the 800 free relay (along with Katie Ledecky, Katie Drabot, and Brooke Forde), and the 400 free relay (along with Drabot, Simone Manuel, and Janet Hu). 

Stanford's Greg Meehan was awarded the 2018 CSCAA Division 1 Women's Coach of the Year for the second year, coaching Simone Manuel, Ella Eastin, Katie Ledecky, and Ally Howe to individual wins.

Team standings
Note: Top 10 only
(H) = Hosts
(DC) = Defending champions
Italics = Debut finish in the Top 10
Full results

Swimming Results

Diving Results

See also
List of college swimming and diving teams

References

NCAA Division I Swimming And Diving Championships
NCAA Division I Swimming And Diving Championships
NCAA Division I Women's Swimming and Diving Championships